Amourj is a department of Hodh Ech Chargui Region in Mauritania. It shares a border to its south with Mali and to the north, east and west are the departments of Timbedra, Néma and Bassikounou.

References 

Departments of Mauritania